Macropharynx is a genus of plants in the family Apocynaceae, first described as a genus in 1927. It is native to  South America and Central America.

Species
 Macropharynx anomala Woodson - Ecuador
 Macropharynx meyeri (C.Ezcurra) Xifreda - NW Argentina
 Macropharynx renteriae A.H.Gentry - Costa Rica, Honduras, Colombia, Ecuador
 Macropharynx spectabilis (Stadelm.) Woodson - Colombia, Venezuela, Guyana, Suriname, NW Brazil, Peru, Ecuador 
 Macropharynx steyermarkii (Markgr.) J.F.Morales - NW Venezuela

References

Apocynaceae genera
Echiteae